Heiwa Dōri (平和通り, Peace Street) of Naha, is a shopping location and tourist attraction in Okinawa.  The street features many gift shops selling wares that range from stone Shisa dogs, which are traditional statues placed on the roofs of many Okinawan homes as protection from evil, and tempura to colored glass and geta clogs.

Shopping districts and streets in Japan
Tourist attractions in Okinawa Prefecture
Geography of Okinawa Prefecture